Turn On may refer to:
Turn-on, another word for sexual arousal
Turn-On, a 1969 American sketch comedy TV series that was cancelled during its first episode
The Turn-Ons, an American rock band
Turn On, an English rock band formed by Tim Gane of Stereolab
Turn on (The Beat Box), a single by American band Earth, Wind & Fire
TurnOn, a 2015 video game developed  Brainy Studio LLC

See also 
"Turn on, tune in, drop out", a 1999 counterculture phrase coined by Timothy Leary in the 1960
Switch, an electrical component that allows a circuit to be turned on or off